Amylascus is a genus of truffle-like fungi in the Pezizaceae family. The genus, which contains two species found in Australasia, was circumscribed by mycologist James Trappe in 1971.

References

Pezizaceae
Truffles (fungi)
Pezizales genera
Taxa named by James Trappe